Royal Mountain Records is a Canadian independent record label and artist-management company, based in Toronto, Canada. The Royal Mountain roster currently consists of more than 30 active artists including Alvvays, Mac DeMarco, and U.S. Girls. Their alumni include PUP, Orville Peck and White Reaper.

History 
Founded in 2009 by Hollerado front man Menno Versteeg and Adam “Bix” Berger, the label was originally intended as a means to self release Hollerado's debut Record in a Bag (RMR-001). It soon became a platform to launch the careers of other local Toronto artists such as PUP and Alvvays. Upon the success of these releases, the label signed international acts such as Mac DeMarco, Metz and U.S. Girls, while continuing to support local artists such as Calpurnia and Dizzy. Recent additions to the Royal Mountain roster include Shady Nasty, Bad Waitress, Ellis, KOKOKO!, Nap Eyes, and Wolf Parade. In 2018, it was hailed by Now Magazine as one of the strongest rock record labels in Toronto.

Mental Health Initiative 
In 2019, Royal Mountain Records implemented a mental health fund for the artists signed to the label in order to provide $1,500 (non-recoupable) to put towards their mental health. Royal Mountain is the first label to start a program like this.

Current roster

Awards and Accolades

Juno Awards

Polaris Prize

Much Music Video Awards

References

External links 
 

Record labels established in 2009
Canadian independent record labels